Quicksand is a novel by American author Nella Larsen, first published in 1928. This is her first novel and she completed the first draft quickly. The novel was out of print from the 1930s to the 1970s. Quicksand is a work that explores both cross-cultural and interracial themes. Larsen dedicated the novel to her husband.

Discussing the novel, Jacquelyn Y. McLendon called it the more "obviously autobiographical" of Larsen's two novels. Larsen called the emotional experiences of the novel "the awful truth" in a letter to her friend Carl van Vechten.

Plot 
Nella Larsen introduces the educated mixed-race protagonist, Helga Crane, who struggles to find her identity in a world of racialized crisis in the 1920s. The novel begins with Helga teaching at a southern black school in Naxos which is meant to be a fictional mirror of the Tuskegee Institute. Helga is the daughter of a Danish mother, who died when she was an adolescent, and a West Indian father, who is absent. Her early years were spent with her Danish mother and White step-father who loathed her, and there began her torn relationship with her split identity. The novel gives us a glimpse into the dichotomy of biracial identity and the divergence into two vastly different worlds as the protagonist travels through uniquely different cultural spaces from the 1920s Jazz Age Harlem to Copenhagen, Denmark.

While teaching in Naxos, Helga Crane suffers from social angst as she is discontented with the social uplift philosophy delivered by a white preacher. The theme of mainstream white influence is further developed throughout the novel. She is repelled by the subjugate demeanor of her superiors with consideration to their attempts to whitewash her black counterparts and she criticizes the Booker T. Washington-inspired sermon that reinforces racial segregation and warns black students that striving for social equality will lead them to become avaricious. This incites her first endeavor of escapism where she quits her job and moves to Chicago. There, her white maternal uncle, now married to a bigoted woman, shuns her. The inimical encounter instigates her move to Harlem.

When in Harlem, Helga Crane becomes the secretary to a refined, but often hypocritical, black middle-class woman who is obsessed with the "race problem". She is then launched into her third hankering to flee. Crane visits her maternal aunt in Copenhagen. Although she enjoys the lavishness of her new voyage, she is treated as a highly desirable racial exotic which forces her to return to New York City. Close to a mental breakdown, Crane happens onto a store-front revival and has a charismatic religious experience. After marrying the preacher who converted her, she moves with him to the rural Deep South. There she is disillusioned by the people's adherence to religion. In each of her moves, Crane fails to find fulfillment. She is looking for more than how to integrate her mixed ancestry. She expresses complex feelings about what she and her friends consider genetic differences between races.

Throughout the development of the novel, though driven by the search for racial identity, Helga also rejects intimate relationships with every man she encounters at each destination. It isn't until she fully indulges in an intimate relationship that she is forced to exist in one space (Deep South) and becomes stuck.

Historical context 
Larsen wrote Quicksand during an intense American cultural nationalism, where the nation shared one culture. During this period, books and essays devoted to this large period of cultural nationalism and interpretations of African American modernism were released. The majority of the novel took place in Harlem. The story was written and published in 1928, meaning that the 1920s were almost over by the time Nella Larsen had published this fictional autobiography. Many major events took place during the 1920s. On Wall Street in 1920, a terrorist attack killed nearly 40 civilians and injured hundreds. With more gruesome things happening, the KKK (Ku Klux Klan) sowed fear in the whole nation. 

During the 1920s, the "Lost Generation" began its transformation of American literature. The term was "coined from something Gertrude Stein witnessed the owner of a garage saying to his young employee, which Hemingway later used as an epigraph to his novel The Sun Also Rises (1926): "You are all a lost generation." This accusation referred to the lack of purpose or drive resulting from the horrific disillusionment felt by those who grew up and lived through the war, and were then in their twenties and thirties." The first-ever licensed radio station was created during the 1920s, and allowed for people to listen in real-time about news, sports, or whatever else. By 1926, there were over 700 radio stations nationwide. The creation of radio stations sparked the formation of mass media. From 1910 to the 1930s, Harlem was in the "golden period" or the "Roaring 20's" and was shaping the path for many African Americans to display their art of music, dance, literature, and much more. Many famous artists still known today were born in the Harlem Renaissance – for example, writer Langston Hughes, poet Countee Cullen, jazz musician Louis Armstrong, Josephine Baker and her musicals, and painter Aaron Douglas. Many more artists came forward as time went on.

Characters 

 Helga Crane – The story's protagonist. Helga's mother was born in Denmark and her father was of west-Indian descent. Helga is a young, biracial woman whose journey's purpose is finding a place where she belongs. She struggles with insecurities. The story begins where she is a teacher at Naxos, a white-imposing school, where she then quits the job that prompts her to spend her time traveling for other jobs and visiting relatives. The story closes with the knowledge that Helga marries a man from the deep south where she ends up being a serial mother.

  James Vayle – Helga's fiancé when she is at Naxos. She ends their relationship when she moves away. James comes off as a serious and boring young man.

 Mrs. Hayes-Rore – Helga's employer that enables Helga to move to Harlem after she leaves Naxos. The protagonist is hired to help Mrs. Hayes-Rore write a speech.

 Dr. Robert Anderson – A 35-year-old man with grey eyes. He is known as the principal of Naxos at the beginning of the story, but then becomes someone that Helga thinks of romantically.

 Anne Grey – Helga's friend that ultimately influences her to the Harlem Culture. Is a socialite and the widow that is utterly obsessed with the race problem brought up in the novel.

  Reverend Mr. Pleasant Green – When Helga returns to New York again in the story, she meets this southern reverend after bumping into him at church. The two then get married and move to Alabama, where they have five children.

 Herr Axel Olsen – Danish artist that proposes to Helga and ultimately gets turned down because he objectifies her.

 Fru Dahl (Aunt Katrina) – Helga's white aunt in Copenhagen, her mother's sister.

 Herr Dahl (Uncle Poul) – Helga's white uncle that lives in Copenhagen. His only wish is for Helga to be happy and get married.

Themes

Race, segregation, and society

Helga's struggles with race are emphasized due to society's attitude toward her. Helga's mental and physical expedition is to find a place where she doesn't draw attention to, or take away from, her differences. However, society and social order play a role in which people are viewed if they are culturally different. Helga's racial identity has been constructed by others' inability to accept her own differences.

Mixed race identity

Helga is a young biracial (half white, half black) woman. For Helga, identifying as a biracial woman means she has fewer restrictions when it comes to racial labels. Her struggles with her identity come from the how other people view themselves and others. Helga's understanding of herself is constructed through cultural artifacts created by others. Helga follows a biracial identity by refusing to follow a strict racial lifestyle but she still acknowledges her black culture.

Race and gender
Helga's future is determined by her sex and her race. Her fascination with clothing and color is a way for Helga to build a female identity for herself. Helga dressed in styles unique to herself and others as a way to stand out from the rest. The way she dressed also goes against the way Naxos wanted their teachers to look. She was meant to stand out.

References

1928 American novels
African-American novels
Harlem Renaissance
Literature by African-American women
American autobiographical novels